Route 205 is a two-lane north/south highway on the south shore of the Saint Lawrence River in the Montérégie region of Quebec, Canada. Its northern terminus is in Beauharnois at the junction of Route 132 and the southern terminus is at the junction of Route 219, in Hemmingford Township.

Municipalities along Route 205
 Hemmingford (Township)
 Sainte-Clotilde
 Saint-Urbain-Premier
 Sainte-Martine
 Beauharnois

Major intersections

See also
 List of Quebec provincial highways

References

External links
 Provincial Route Map (Courtesy of the Quebec Ministry of Transportation) 
 Route 205 in Google Maps

205
Roads in Montérégie